Porto delle Grazie – Marina di Roccella, in Italy, is the marina of Roccella Ionica, municipality of the Locride, located in the metropolitan area of Reggio Calabria.

Structure
The Marina is protected by two docks that orient the entrance to the west and consists of interior piers, modern finger, docks and quays slipway.

Connections
Porto delle Grazie is a touristic marine resort which mainly attracts the travellers of the Mediterranean, especially those exploring the Calabria or those that are directed to Greece, thanks to its proximity to the ports of Corfù and Kefalonia, Lefkas, or in Sicily.
The marina is connected to the city center of Roccella Ionica by a modern bike path and a taxi service, equidistant to the airports of Lamezia Terme and Reggio Calabria. In addition, the 42 municipalities of Locride are easily accessible by public and private transport.

Bathing
Porto delle Grazie is inserted in a favorable environment for bathing. Indeed Roccella Ionica has been awarded the 2016 Blue Flag (for the fourteenth consecutive year) and the 5 Sails (for the second consecutive year, among the only 19 Italian locations to receive the prestigious award).

Curiosity
On 12 July 2016 the FBDesign team marked the nautical record on the Montecarlo - Roccella Ionica - Venice route, and the crew made their refueling stop at the Porto delle Grazie.

References

Marinas